Chabab Al Araich, also called Chabab Larache is a Moroccan football club currently playing in the fourth division from the city Ksar el-Kebir.

References 

Football clubs in Morocco
Sports clubs in Morocco